Basant Kumar Wangkhem is an Indian politician. He was elected to the Manipur Legislative Assembly from Kshetrigao constituency in Manipur in the 1995 and 2000 Manipur Legislative Assembly election as a member of the Janata Dal (Secular) and then Samata Party (Uday Mandal is current President).

References

Living people
Samata Party politicians
Janata Dal politicians
Indian Congress (Socialist) politicians
People from Imphal East district
Year of birth missing (living people)
Manipur MLAs 1995–2000
Manipur MLAs 2000–2002